Rúben Barcelos de Sousa Lameiras (born 22 December 1994) is a Portuguese footballer who plays as a midfielder for Vitória de Guimarães.

Formed at Tottenham Hotspur, he spent his early career in EFL League One, making 131 appearances and scoring 20 goals for Coventry City and Plymouth Argyle and winning the EFL Trophy with the former in 2017. From 2019, he played in the Primeira Liga for Famalicão and Vitória de Guimarães.

Club career

Tottenham Hotspur
Lameiras moved to Tottenham Hotspur's academy in July 2011 and signed a professional contract with the Premier League club in July 2014. He made eight appearances, including five starts, in the Under-21 Premier League in the 2014–15 season, scoring once in the process.

On 26 March 2015, Tottenham announced they had reached an agreement with Swedish club Åtvidabergs FF for the transfer of Lameiras on loan until June, with an option to extend the deal. He made his professional debut on 5 April, in a 1–0 loss away to IFK Göteborg for the season's Allsvenskan. After 14 appearances, he returned to Tottenham, where his contract expired on 30 June.

Coventry City
Lameiras signed a two-year deal with Coventry City on 24 July 2015, after impressing manager Tony Mowbray whilst on trial at the club. He made his debut in senior English football on 8 August, starting in a 2–0 win over Wigan Athletic at the Ricoh Arena in the first game of the League One season. A week later, he scored the first senior goal of his career, in a 4–0 away win over Millwall.

Lameiras scored three goals in six games as Coventry won the 2016–17 EFL Trophy. He played the full 90 minutes of the final on 2 April at Wembley Stadium, a 2–1 win over Oxford United.

Plymouth Argyle
On 8 June 2017, after the Sky Blues' relegation from League One, free agent Lameiras joined newly promoted club Plymouth Argyle. He made his debut for the Pilgrims on 5 August as a 72nd-minute substitute for Jake Jervis in a 2–1 loss at Peterborough United, and afterwards he was praised by his midfield partner Graham Carey. On 4 May 2019, Lameiras was awarded the Plymouth Argyle Player of the Season award following a career-best campaign in his second season as a Pilgrim, having been involved directly in 35% of the Pilgrims' competitive goals – netting 11 times in League One and providing nine assists. He was offered a new contract by Plymouth Argyle at the end of the 2018–19 season.

Famalicão
After two years in Devon, Lameiras returned to his home country of Portugal to play for newly promoted to the Primeira Liga Famalicão, with whom he signed a four-year contract on 24 June 2019. He made his debut on 10 August in the team's first top-flight game for 25 years, starting in a 2–0 win at C.D. Santa Clara; on 23 September he scored his first goal to equalise in a 2–1 win at Sporting CP.

Vitória de Guimarães
On 8 January 2021, Lameiras joined fellow Primeira Liga side Vitória de Guimarães on a three-and-a-half year deal, agreeing a contract with a €50 million release clause. He played 11 remaining games of the season, scoring a consolation in a 4–2 home loss to Gil Vicente F.C. on 14 March.

Lameiras played his first game in European competition on 21 July 2022, scoring a fourth-minute opener in a 3–0 win over Hungary's Puskás Akadémia FC at the Estádio D. Afonso Henriques in the second qualifying round of the UEFA Europa Conference League.

Career statistics

Honours

Club
Coventry City
EFL Trophy: 2016–17

Individual
Plymouth Argyle Player of the Season: 2018–19

References

External links

1994 births
Living people
Footballers from Lisbon
Portuguese footballers
Association football midfielders
Tottenham Hotspur F.C. players
Åtvidabergs FF players
Coventry City F.C. players
Plymouth Argyle F.C. players
F.C. Famalicão players
Allsvenskan players
English Football League players
Primeira Liga players
Portuguese expatriate footballers
Expatriate footballers in England
Expatriate footballers in Sweden
Portuguese expatriates in England
Portuguese expatriate sportspeople in Sweden